La Cuaima, also known as Carmencita, la Cuaima, is a Venezuelan telenovela created by Carlos Pérez that premiered on Radio Caracas Televisión on August 6, 2006, and ended on February 9, 2004. It stars Catherine Correia as the titular character.

Cast

Main 
 Catherine Correia as  Carmen "Carmencita" Meléndez
 Jonathan Montenegro as Simón Alvarenga
 Juan Carlos Alarcón as Juan Pescao
 Chantal Baudaux as Alfonsina Russo / La Nena
 Luis Fernández as Cristo Jesús Guédez
 Julie Restifo as Arminda Rovaina de Cáceres
 Luis Gerardo Núñez as Basilio Alvarenga

Recurring 
 Ámbar Díaz as Yamileth Cáceres Rovaina
 Flor Elena González as Pepita Hamilton de Alvarenga
 Margarita Hernández as Luisa Russo
 Javier Valcárcel as Cruz Esteban Guédez
 Juan Carlos Tarazona as Leonardo José "Leo" Cáceres Rovaina
 Juliet Lima as Daysi Chacón
 Vito Lonardo as Don Piero Russo
 Alejandro Otero as Celso Russo
 Gioia Arismendi as Maigualida Campos
 Aura Rivas as Matea Guaramato 
 Maria Alejandra Colón as Carolina "Caro" de Russo
 Ligia Petit as Elda Ramírez
 Kimberly Dos Ramos as Bambi Cáceres Rovaina
 Gabriel López as Coco O'Brian
 Dora Mazzone as Modesta Meléndez
 Carlos Arreaza as Alexis Barragán
 Victoria Robert as Elvia / La Comadre
 Leopoldo Regnault as Comisario Montoya
 Marcos Campos as Emilio

References

External links 
 

2003 telenovelas
Spanish-language telenovelas
Venezuelan telenovelas
RCTV telenovelas
2003 Venezuelan television series debuts
2004 Venezuelan television series endings
Television shows set in Caracas